Ledyanyye Islands (Ostrova Ledyanyye) are a small island group in the Kara Sea. They are coastal islands near the Nordenskiöld Archipelago, which lies further east.

Geography

The smaller western island is only  in length.
 
The sea surrounding the Ledyanyye Islands is covered with pack ice with some polynias during the long and harsh winters and there are many ice floes even in the summer.

This island group belongs to the Taymyrsky Dolgano-Nenetsky District of the Krasnoyarsk Krai administrative division of Russia and is part of the Great Arctic State Nature Reserve – the largest nature reserve of Russia and one of the biggest in the world.

See also
 List of islands of Russia

References

Islands of the Kara Sea
Islands of Krasnoyarsk Krai